Something to Say is the third full-length studio album by Contemporary Christian music artist Matthew West. It was released on January 15, 2008 through Sparrow Records. The album's first single, "You Are Everything", was the most-played song on Christian AC radio in 2008. Other singles from the album include the title track "Something to Say", and West's third #1 single, "The Motions".

Track listing

Personnel 
 Matthew West – lead vocals, backing vocals, acoustic guitar 
 Christopher Stevens – keyboards, programming, electric guitar, backing vocals 
 Ed Cash – acoustic piano, keyboards, programming, acoustic guitar, electric guitar, backing vocals
 Tim Lauer – keyboards, acoustic piano, Hammond B3 organ, programming 
 Sam Mizell – keyboards, programming 
 Ben Shive – keyboards 
 Cary Barlowe – electric guitar 
 George Cocchini – acoustic guitar, electric guitar 
 Rob Hawkins – electric guitar 
 Eric McPherson – electric guitar 
 Jerry McPherson – acoustic guitar, electric guitar
 Paul Moak – electric guitar
 Mike Payne – acoustic guitar, electric guitar 
 Tony Lucido – bass 
 Matt Pierson – bass 
 Dan Needham – drums 
 Will Sayles – drums 
 Eric Darken – percussion 
 John Catchings – cello, strings
 David Davidson – strings
 Michelle Swift – backing vocals 
 Terry White – backing vocals

Production 
 Brad O'Donnell – A&R 
 Christopher Stevens – producer (1, 2, 5, 10), engineer (1, 2, 5, 10)
 Brown Bannister – producer (3, 6, 7, 9), overdubbing (3, 6, 7, 9)
 Ed Cash – producer (4, 8, 11, 12), engineer (8, 11)
 Sam Mizell – associate producer
 Steve Bishir – engineer (3, 6, 7, 9), overdubbing (3, 6, 7, 9)
 Bobby Shin – engineer (3, 6, 7, 9)
 Bill Whittington – overdubbing (3, 6, 7, 9), digital editing (3, 6, 7, 9)
 Ben Phillips – engineer (4, 12)
 Kevin Powell – assistant engineer (4, 8, 11, 12)
 Aaron Sternke – digital editing (3, 6, 7, 9)
 Tim Lauer – overdubbing (8, 11)
 F. Reid Shippen – mixing 
 Ted Jensen – mastering 
 Jess Chambers – A&R administration 
 Josh Byrd – art direction 
 Jan Cook – art direction 
 Clark Hook – design
 Allen Clark – photography 
 True Artist Management – management 

Studios
 Recorded at FabMusic, Dark Horse Recording and Ed's (Franklin, Tennessee); Bletchley Park and Blackbird Studio (Nashville, Tennessee).
 Overdubbed at Ed's; Townsend Sound Studios and Dogwood Studio (Nashville, Tennessee).
 Mastered at Sterling Sound (New York City, New York).

References

2008 albums
Matthew West albums
Sparrow Records albums